Chester & Lester is a collaborative album by guitarists Chet Atkins and Les Paul released in 1976.

It was recorded in the mid-1970s when Atkins was in his fifties and Paul in his sixties. Atkins coaxed Paul out of his decade-long retirement for this recording. The liner notes state there is very little overdubbing and the majority of the album was live in the studio.

Chester & Lester peaked at No. 11 on Billboard's Country album chart and No. 172 on the Pop album chart. It peaked at No. 27 on the Country chart again in 1978. At the Grammy Awards of 1976, Chester & Lester won the Grammy Award for Best Country Instrumental Performance.

Reissues
 Both Chester & Lester and Guitar Monsters were released on CD in 1989 by Pair Records as Masters of the Guitar: Together with some tracks omitted.
 In 1998, Chester and Lester and the duo's follow-up release Guitar Monsters were reissued intact on one CD on One Way Records.
 Chester & Lester was reissued in 2007 on RCA Nashville/Legacy with four bonus tracks.

Track listing

Side one
 "It's Been a Long Time" (Sammy Cahn, Jule Styne) – 3:33
 "Medley: Moonglow/Picnic (theme from Picnic)" – 4:44
 "Caravan" (Duke Ellington, Irving Mills, Juan Tizol) – 3:21
 "It Had to Be You" (Isham Jones, Gus Kahn) – 3:34
 "Out of Nowhere" (Johnny Green, Edward Heyman) – 3:14

Side two
 "Avalon" (Buddy DeSylva, Al Jolson, Vincent Rose) – 6:32
 "Birth of the Blues" (Lew Brown, Buddy G. DeSylva, Ray Henderson) – 3:07
 "Someday Sweetheart" (Spikes, Spikes) – 3:21
 "'Deed I Do" (Walter Hirsch, Fred Rose) – 2:31
 "Lover Come Back to Me" (Oscar Hammerstein, Sigmund Romberg) – 2:44

Bonus tracks on Columbia Nashville CD re-release:
 "The World Is Waiting for the Sunrise" (previously unreleased)
 "You Brought a New Kind of Love to Me" (previously unreleased)
 "Caravan" (previously unreleased alternate take)
 "Moonglow / Picnic (Theme From 'Picnic')" (previously unreleased rehearsal take)

Personnel
Chet Atkins – guitar
Les Paul – guitar
Randy Goodrum – piano
Larrie Londin – drums
Ray Edenton – guitar
Henry Strzelecki – bass
Bob Moore – bass
Kenneth Aronson – album cover design
Kenneth Aronson, Chip DeVilbiss – photography

References

Chet Atkins albums
1976 albums
Albums produced by Chet Atkins
RCA Records albums
Les Paul albums
Collaborative albums